The 2001 Swiss Figure Skating Championships (officially named  and ) were held in Genève from January 12 through 13th, 2001. Medals were awarded in the disciplines of men's singles, ladies' singles, and Ice dancing.

Senior results

Men

Ladies

Ice dancing

External links
 results

Swiss Figure Skating Championships
Swiss Figure Skating Championships, 2001